Lycée Léonard de Vinci is a senior high school/sixth-form college in Tremblay-en-France, Seine-Saint-Denis, France, in the Paris metropolitan area.

In 2002 the school prevented a female student who wore a black jilbab from attending classes.

References

External links
 Lycée Léonard de Vinci 
 Lycée Léonard de Vinci  (Archive)

Lycées in Seine-Saint-Denis